Trans Jayapura or Trans Metro Jayapura is a bus rapid transit (BRT) system in Jayapura city of Papua, Indonesia. Bus vehicles was received by city government since 2017, but the system was not operational until 2019. There are four routes: Terminal Mesran – Angkasa, Terminal Mesran – Pasir II, Terminal Entrop – Terminal Batas Kota (City Border) Waena, and Terminal Entrop – Terminal Skouw Perbatasan (Borders, to Indonesia-Papua New Guinea border post). On 2020, Ministry of Transportation lend the city government 200 units of bus for National Sports Week, which later after the event would be taken back. Current price of the ticket is IDR 3.500.

Routes

References 

Bus rapid transit in Indonesia
Jayapura
Transport in Papua (province)